Fahem Hammachi  is an Algerian boxer. He represent Algeria at the  2016 Summer Olympics in Rio de Janeiro Brazil, but he was defeated in the round of 32 against the Brazilian Boxer Robenílson de Jesus 1-2.

References

Living people
Olympic boxers of Algeria
Boxers at the 2016 Summer Olympics
Bantamweight boxers
1992 births
Algerian male boxers
Competitors at the 2013 Mediterranean Games
Mediterranean Games competitors for Algeria
21st-century Algerian people